PowerPark is a large scale karting and amusement park in Alahärmä, Finland. The main karting track already resembles an F1 circuit and has previously hosted the Karting World Championship, but they also have a hectare-large indoor track, the largest in Europe. Other than that the resort also contains a restaurant, large hotel, a camping area with cottages and all sorts of amusement rides.

PowerPark was founded by Jorma Lillbacka, an entrepreneur and financier from Alahärmä, and according to estimates by Talouselämä magazine, Lillbacka has invested 100–200 million euros in the amusement park since its establishment. In 2015, PowerPark had as many as 450,000 visitors. In a study conducted by Taloustutkimus Oy, the PowerPark experience park was rated the best leisure center in Finland in 2010, 2013, 2014, 2015 and 2016. The South Ostrobothnia Tourism Prize (Etelä-Pohjanmaan matkailupalkinto) was also awarded to PowerPark in 2010.

PowerLand

Major rides 

In 2007, a worker died after being hit by the Typhoon ride. According to the news, she was retrieving a shoe. After the incident, the park was closed earlier than usual and both workers and customers were given crisis aid.

Family rides

Kiddie rides

Removed rides

Horse centre

The Riding Centre of PowerPark is being completed and will start its operations in 2008. The centre is located in a peaceful place, behind a small woods, in the vicinity of PowerPark. The Riding Centre will provide horse treks of different kinds in South Ostrobothnian landscapes.

References

External links

Official homepage in English

Amusement parks in Finland
Kauhava
Buildings and structures in South Ostrobothnia
Tourist attractions in South Ostrobothnia
1999 establishments in Finland
Amusement parks opened in 1999